The Almoravid dynasty was an imperial Berber Muslim dynasty centered in the territory of present-day Morocco. It established an empire in the 11th century that stretched over the western Maghreb and Al-Andalus, starting in the 1050s and lasting until its fall to the Almohads in 1147. The Almoravid capital was Marrakesh, a city founded by the Almoravid leader Abu Bakr ibn Umar . The dynasty emerged from a coalition of the Lamtuna, Gudala, and Massufa, nomadic Berber tribes living in what is now Mauritania and the Western Sahara, traversing the territory between the Draa, the Niger, and the Senegal rivers.

The Almoravids were crucial in preventing the fall of Al-Andalus (Muslim rule in Iberia) to the Iberian Christian kingdoms, when they decisively defeated a coalition of the Castilian and Aragonese armies at the Battle of Sagrajas in 1086. Their rulers never claimed the title of caliph and instead took on the title of Amir al-Muslimīn ("Prince of the Muslims") while formally acknowledging the overlordship of the Abbasid Caliphs in Baghdad. However, the rule of the dynasty was relatively short-lived. The Almoravids fell—at the height of their power—when they failed to stop the Masmuda-led rebellion initiated by Ibn Tumart. As a result, their last king Ishaq ibn Ali was killed in Marrakesh in April 1147 by the Almohad Caliphate, which replaced them as a ruling dynasty both in the Maghreb and Al-Andalus.

Name

In Arabic, "" literally means "one who is tying" but figuratively means "one who is ready for battle at a fortress".

The name "Almoravid" was tied to a school of Malikite law called "Dar al-Murabitin" founded in Sus al-Aksa, modern day Morocco, by a scholar named Waggag ibn Zallu. Ibn Zallu sent his student Abdallah ibn Yasin to preach Malikite Islam to the Sanhaja Berbers of the Adrar (present-day Mauritania). Hence, the name of the Almoravids comes from the followers of the Dar al-Murabitin, "the house of those who were bound together in the cause of God."

It is uncertain exactly when or why the Almoravids acquired that appellation. al-Bakri, writing in 1068, before their apex, already calls them the al-Murabitun, but does not clarify the reasons for it. Writing three centuries later, Ibn Abi Zar suggested it was chosen early on by Abdallah ibn Yasin because, upon finding resistance among the Gudala Berbers of Adrar (Mauritania) to his teaching, he took a handful of followers to erect a makeshift ribat (monastery-fortress) on an offshore island (possibly Tidra island, in the Bay of Arguin). Ibn 'Idhari wrote that the name was suggested by Ibn Yasin in the "persevering in the fight" sense, to boost morale after a particularly hard-fought battle in the Draa valley , in which they had taken many losses. Whichever explanation is true, it seems certain the appellation was chosen by the Almoravids for themselves, partly with the conscious goal of forestalling any tribal or ethnic identifications.

The name might be related to the ribat of Waggag ibn Zallu in the village of Aglu (near present-day Tiznit), where the future Almoravid spiritual leader Abdallah ibn Yasin got his initial training. The 13th-century Moroccan biographer Ibn al-Zayyat al-Tadili, and Qadi Ayyad before him in the 12th century, note that Waggag's learning center was called Dar al-Murabitin (The house of the Almoravids), and that might have inspired Ibn Yasin's choice of name for the movement.

The Almoravids veiled themselves below the eyes with a tagelmust, a custom they adapted from southern Sanhaja Berbers. (This can still be seen among the modern Tuareg people, but it was unusual further north.) Although practical for the desert dust, the Almoravids insisted on wearing the veil everywhere, as a badge of "foreignness" in urban settings, partly as a way of emphasizing their puritan credentials. It served as the uniform of the Almoravids. Under their rule, sumptuary laws forbade anybody else from wearing the veil, thereby making it the distinctive dress of the ruling class. In turn, the succeeding Almohads made a point of mocking the Almoravid veil as symbolic of effeminacy and decadence.

History

Origins

The Berbers of the Maghreb in the early Middle Ages could be roughly classified into three major groups: the Zenata across the north, the Masmuda, concentrated in central Morocco, and the Sanhaja, clustered in the western part of the Sahara and the hills of the eastern Maghreb. The eastern Sanhaja included the Kutama Berbers, who had been the base of the Fatimid rise in the early 10th century, and the Zirid dynasty, who ruled Ifriqiya as vassals of the Fatimids after the latter moved to Egypt in 972. The western Sanhaja were divided into several tribes: the Gazzula and the Lamta in the Draa valley and the foothills of the Anti-Atlas range; further south, encamped in the western Sahara, were the Massufa, the Banu Warith; and most southerly of all, the Lamtuna and Gudala, in littoral Mauritania down to the borderlands of the Senegal River.

The western Sanhaja had been converted to Islam some time in the 9th century. They were subsequently united in the 10th century and, with the zeal of new converts, launched several campaigns against the "Sudanese" (pagan peoples of sub-Saharan Africa). Under their king Tinbarutan ibn Usfayshar, the Sanhaja Lamtuna erected (or captured) the citadel of Aoudaghost, a critical stop on the trans-Saharan trade route. After the collapse of the Sanhaja union, Aoudaghost passed over to the Ghana Empire; and the trans-Saharan routes were taken over by the Zenata Maghrawa of Sijilmasa. The Maghrawa also exploited this disunion to dislodge the Sanhaja Gazzula and Lamta out of their pasturelands in the Sous and Draa valleys. Around 1035, the Lamtuna chieftain Abu Abdallah Muhammad ibn Tifat (alias Tarsina), tried to reunite the Sanhaja desert tribes, but his reign lasted less than three years.

Around 1040, Yahya ibn Ibrahim, a chieftain of the Gudala (and brother-in-law of the late Tarsina), went on pilgrimage to Mecca. On his return, he stopped by Kairouan in Ifriqiya, where he met Abu Imran al-Fasi, a native of Fez and a jurist and scholar of the Sunni Maliki school. At this time, Ifriqiya was in ferment. The Zirid ruler, al-Mu'izz ibn Badis, was openly contemplating breaking with his Shi'ite Fatimid overlords in Cairo, and the jurists of Kairouan were agitating for him to do so. Within this heady atmosphere, Yahya and Abu Imran fell into conversation on the state of the faith in their western homelands, and Yahya expressed his disappointment at the lack of religious education and negligence of Islamic law among his southern Sanhaja people. With Abu Imran's recommendation, Yahya ibn Ibrahim made his way to the ribat of Waggag ibn Zelu in the Sous valley of southern Morocco, to seek out a Maliki teacher for his people. Waggag assigned him one of his residents, Abdallah ibn Yasin.

Abdallah ibn Yasin was a Gazzula Berber, and probably a convert rather than a born Muslim. His name can be read as "son of Ya-Sin" (the title of the 36th surah of the Quran), suggesting he had obliterated his family past and was "re-born" of the Holy Book. Ibn Yasin certainly had the ardor of a puritan zealot; his creed was mainly characterized by a rigid formalism and a strict adherence to the dictates of the Quran, and the Orthodox tradition. (Chroniclers such as al-Bakri allege Ibn Yasin's learning was superficial.) Ibn Yasin's initial meetings with the Godala people went poorly. As he had more ardor than depth, Ibn Yasin's arguments were disputed by his audience. He responded to questioning with charges of apostasy and handed out harsh punishments for the slightest deviations. The Godala soon had enough and expelled him almost immediately after the death of his protector, Yahya ibn Ibrahim, sometime in the 1040s.

Ibn Yasin, however, found a more favorable reception among the neighboring Lamtuna people. Probably sensing the useful organizing power of Ibn Yasin's pious fervor, the Lamtuna chieftain Yahya ibn Umar al-Lamtuni invited the man to preach to his people. The Lamtuna leaders, however, kept Ibn Yasin on a careful leash, forging a more productive partnership between them. Invoking stories of the early life of Muhammad, Ibn Yasin preached that conquest was a necessary addendum to Islamicization, that it was not enough to merely adhere to God's law, but necessary to also destroy opposition to it. In Ibn Yasin's ideology, anything and everything outside of Islamic law could be characterized as "opposition". He identified tribalism, in particular, as an obstacle. He believed it was not enough to urge his audiences to put aside their blood loyalties and ethnic differences, and embrace the equality of all Muslims under the Sacred Law, it was necessary to make them do so. For the Lamtuna leadership, this new ideology dovetailed with their long desire to refound the Sanhaja union and recover their lost dominions. In the early 1050s, the Lamtuna, under the joint leadership of Yahya ibn Umar and Abdallah ibn Yasin—soon calling themselves the al-Murabitin (Almoravids)—set out on a campaign to bring their neighbors over to their cause.

Conquests

Northern Africa
From 1053, the Almoravids began to Islamize the Berber areas of the Sahara and the regions south of the desert. After winning over the Sanhaja Berber tribe, they quickly took control of the entire desert trade route, seizing Sijilmasa at the northern end in 1054, and Aoudaghost (Awdaghust) at the southern end in 1055. Yahya ibn Umar was killed in a battle in 1057, but Abdullah ibn Yasin, whose influence as a religious teacher was paramount, named his brother Abu Bakr ibn Umar as chief. Under him, the Almoravids soon began to spread their power beyond the desert, and conquered the tribes of the Atlas Mountains. In 1058 they crossed the High Atlas and conquered Aghmat, a prosperous commercial town near the foothills of the mountains, and made it their capital. They then came in contact with the Barghawata, a Berber tribal confederation, who followed an Islamic "heresy" preached by Salih ibn Tarif three centuries earlier. The Barghawata resisted. Abdullah ibn Yasin was killed in battle with them in 1059, in Krifla, a village near Rommani, Morocco. They were, however, completely conquered by Abu Bakr ibn Umar, and were forced to convert to orthodox Islam. Abu Bakr married a noble and wealthy Berber woman, Zaynab an-Nafzawiyyah, who would become very influential in the development of the dynasty. Zaynab was the daughter of a wealthy merchant from Houara, who was said to be from Kairouan.

In 1061, Abu Bakr ibn Umar made a division of the power he had established, handing over the more-settled parts to his cousin Yusuf ibn Tashfin as viceroy, and also assigning to him his favourite wife Zaynab. Ibn Umar kept the task of suppressing the revolts that had broken out in the desert. When he returned to resume control, he found his cousin too powerful to be superseded. Abu Bakr ibn Umar founded the new capital of Marrakesh around this time. Historical sources cite a variety of dates for this event ranging from 1062, given by Ibn Abi Zar and Ibn Khaldun, to 1078 (470 AH), given by Muhammad al-Idrisi. The year 1070, given by Ibn Idhari, is more commonly cited by modern historians. Some writers cite the year 1062. In November 1087 Abu Bakr was killed in battle – according to oral tradition by an arrow – while fighting in the historic region of the Sudan.

Yusuf ibn Tashfin had in the meantime brought the large area of what is now Morocco, Western Sahara, and Mauritania under Almoravid control. He spent at least several years capturing each fort and settlement in the region around Fez and in northern Morocco. After most of the surrounding region was under his control, he was finally able to conquer Fez definitively. However, there is some contradiction and uncertainty among historical sources regarding the exact chronology of these conquests, with some sources dating the main conquests to the 1060s and others dating them to the 1070s. Some modern authors cite the date of the final conquest of Fez as 1069 (461 AH). Historian Ronald Messier gives the date more specifically as 18 March 1070 (462 AH). Other historians date this conquest to 1074 or 1075.

In 1079 Ibn Tashfin sent an army 20,000 strong from Marrakesh to push towards what is now Tlemcen to attack the Banu Ya'la, the Zenata tribe occupying the area. Led by a commander named Mazdali Ibn Tilankan, the army defeated the Banu Ya'la and executed their leader, Mali Ibn Ya'la, but did not push to Tlemcen right away. Instead, Ibn Tashfin himself led an army in 1081 that conquered Tlemcen, massacring the Maghrawa forces there and their leader, al-Abbas Ibn Bakhti al-Maghrawi. He pressed on and by 1082 he had captured Algiers. Ibn Tashfin subsequently treated Tlemcen as his eastern base. At that time the city had consisted of an older settlement called Agadir, but Ibn Tashfin founded a new city next to it called Takrart, which later merged with Agadir in the Almohad period to become the present city.

The Almoravids subsequently clashed with the Hammadids to the east multiple times, but they did not make a sustained effort to conquer the central Maghrib and instead focused their efforts on other fronts. Eventually, in 1104, they signed a peace treaty with the Hammadids. Algiers became their easternmost outpost. Before campaigning in Al-Andalus, where the Taifas emirs were requesting his help, Ibn Tashfin made the capture of Ceuta his primary objective instead. Ceuta, controlled by Zenata forces under the command of Diya al-Dawla Yahya, was the last major city on the African side of the Strait of Gibraltar that still held out against him. In return for a promise to help him against the encroaching Christian kingdoms, Ibn Tashfin demanded that al-Mu'tamid ibn Abbad, the ruler of Seville, provide assistance in besieging the city. Al-Mu'tamid obliged and sent a fleet to blockade the city by sea, while Ibn Tashfin's son Tamim led the siege by land. The city finally surrendered in August 1084.

Ghana Empire and the southern wing
According to Arab tradition, the Almoravids conquered the Ghana Empire sometime around 1076 CE. An example of this tradition is the record of historian Ibn Khaldun, who cited Shaykh Uthman, the faqih of Ghana, writing in 1394. According to this source, the Almoravids weakened Ghana and collected tribute from the Sudan, to the extent that the authority of the rulers of Ghana dwindled away, and they were subjugated and absorbed by the Sosso, a neighboring people of the Sudan. Traditions in Mali related that the Sosso attacked and took over Mali as well, and the ruler of the Sosso, Sumaouro Kanté, took over the land.

However criticism from Conrad and Fisher (1982) argued that the notion of any Almoravid military conquest at its core is merely perpetuated folklore, derived from a misinterpretation or naive reliance on Arabic sources. According to Professor Timothy Insoll, the archaeology of ancient Ghana simply does not show the signs of rapid change and destruction that would be associated with any Almoravid-era military conquests.

Dierke Lange agreed with the original military incursion theory but argues that this doesn't preclude Almoravid political agitation, claiming that the main factor of the demise of the Ghana Empire owed much to the latter. According to Lange, Almoravid religious influence was gradual, rather than the result of military action; there the Almoravids gained power by marrying among the nation's nobility. Lange attributes the decline of ancient Ghana to numerous unrelated factors, one of which is likely attributable to internal dynastic struggles instigated by Almoravid influence and Islamic pressures, but devoid of military conquest.

This interpretation of events has been disputed by later scholars like Sheryl L. Burkhalter (1992), who argued that, whatever the nature of the "conquest" in the south of the Sahara, the influence and success of the Almoravid movement in securing west African gold and circulating it widely necessitated a high degree of political control.

The traditional position says that the ensuing war with the Almoravids pushed Ghana over the edge, ending the kingdom's position as a commercial and military power by 1100. It collapsed into tribal groups and chieftaincies, some of which later assimilated into the Almoravids while others founded the Mali Empire.

The Arab geographer Ibn Shihab al-Zuhri wrote that the Almoravids ended Ibadi Islam in Tadmekka in 1084 and that Abu Bakr "arrived at the mountain of gold" in the deep south.
After the death of Abu Bakr (1087), the confederation of Berber tribes in the Sahara was divided between the descendants of Abu Bakr and his brother Yahya, and would have lost control of Ghana. Sheryl Burkhalter suggests that Abu Bakr's son Yahya was the leader of the Almoravid expedition that conquered Ghana in 1076, and that the Almoravids would have survived the loss of Ghana and the defeat in the Maghreb by the Almohads, and would have ruled the Sahara until the end of the 12th century.

Southern Iberia and the northern wing

In 1086 Yusuf ibn Tashfin was invited by the Muslim taifa princes of Al-Andalus in the Iberian Peninsula to defend their territories from the encroachment of Alfonso VI, King of León and Castile. In that year, Ibn Tashfin crossed the Strait of Gibraltar to Algeciras, and defeated Castile at the Battle of Sagrajas. He was prevented from following up his victory by trouble in Africa, which he chose to settle in person.

He returned to Iberia in 1090, avowedly for the purpose of annexing the taifa principalities of Iberia. He was supported by most of the Iberian people, who were discontented with the heavy taxation imposed upon them by their spendthrift rulers. Their religious teachers, as well as others in the east (most notably, al-Ghazali in Persia and al-Turtushi in Egypt, who was himself an Iberian by birth from Tortosa), detested the taifa rulers for their religious indifference. The clerics issued a fatwa (a non-binding legal opinion) that Yusuf was of sound morals and had the religious right to dethrone the rulers, whom he saw as heterodox in their faith. By 1094, Yusuf had annexed most of the major taifas, with the exception of the one at Zaragoza. The Almoravids were victorious at the Battle of Consuegra, during which the son of El Cid, Diego Rodríguez, perished. Alfonso, with some Leónese, retreated into the castle of Consuegra, which was besieged for eight days until the Almoravids withdrew to the south.

After friendly correspondence with the caliph at Baghdad, whom he acknowledged as Amir al-Mu'minin ("Commander of the Faithful"), Yusuf ibn Tashfin in 1097 assumed the title of Amir al Muslimin ("Commander of the Muslims"). He died in 1106, when he was reputed to have reached the age of 100. The Almoravid power was at its height at Yusuf's death: the Moorish empire then included all of Northwest Africa as far eastward as Algiers, and all of Iberia south of the Tagus and as far eastward as the mouth of the Ebro, and including the Balearic Islands.

In 1108 Tamim Al Yusuf defeated the Kingdom of Castile at the Battle of Uclés. Yusuf did not reconquer much territory from the Christian kingdoms, except that of Valencia; but he did hinder the progress of the Christian Reconquista by uniting al-Andalus. In 1134, at the Battle of Fraga, the Almoravids were victorious and even succeeded in slaying Alfonso the Battler in the battle.

Decline

Under Yusuf's son and successor, Ali ibn Yusuf, Sintra and Santarém were added, and he invaded Iberia again in 1119 and 1121, but the tide had turned, as the French had assisted the Aragonese to recover Zaragoza. In 1138, Ali ibn Yusuf was defeated by Alfonso VII of León and Castile, and in the Battle of Ourique (1139), by Afonso I of Portugal, who thereby won his crown. Lisbon was conquered by the Portuguese in 1147.

According to some scholars, Ali ibn Yusuf represented a new generation of leadership that had forgotten the desert life for the comforts of the city. He was defeated by the combined action of his Christian foes in Iberia and the agitation of the Almohads (Muwahhids) in Morocco. After Ali ibn Yusuf's death in 1143, his son Tashfin ibn Ali lost ground rapidly before the Almohads. In 1146 he was killed in a fall from a precipice while attempting to escape after a defeat near Oran.

His two successors were Ibrahim ibn Tashfin and Ishaq ibn Ali, but their reigns were short. The conquest of the city of Marrakesh by the Almohads in 1147 marked the fall of the dynasty, though fragments of the Almoravids continued to struggle throughout the empire. Among these fragments, there was the rebel Yahya Al-Sahrāwiyya, who resisted Almohad rule in the Maghreb for eight years after the fall of Marrakesh before surrendering in 1155. Also in 1155, the remaining Almoravids were forced to retreat to the Balearic Islands and later Ifriqiya under the leadership of the Banu Ghaniya, who were eventually influential in the downfall of their conquerors, the Almohads, in the Eastern part of the Maghreb.

Culture

Religion 

The Almoravid movement started as a conservative Islamic reform movement inspired by the Maliki school of jurisprudence. The writings of Abu Imran al-Fasi, a Moroccan Maliki scholar, influenced Yahya Ibn Ibrahim and the early Almoravid movement.

Art 

Amira Bennison describes the art of the Almoravid period as influenced by the "integration of several areas into a single political unit and the resultant development of a widespread Andalusi–Maghribi style", as well as the tastes of the Sanhaja rulers as patrons of art. Bennison also challenges Robert Hillenbrand's characterization of the art of al-Andalus and the Maghreb as provincial and peripheral in consideration of Islamic art globally, and of the contributions of the Almoravids as "sparse" as a result of the empire's "puritanical fervour" and "ephemerality."

At first, the Almoravids, subscribing to the conservative Maliki school of Islamic jurisprudence, rejected what they perceived as decadence and a lack of piety among the Iberian Muslims of the Andalusi taifa kingdoms. However, monuments and textiles from Almería from the late Almoravid period indicate that the empire had changed its attitude with time.

Artistic production under the Almoravids included finely constructed minbars produced in Córdoba; marble basins and tombstones in Almería; fine textiles in Almería, Málaga, Seville; and luxury ceramics.

Marble work 
A large group of marble tombstones have been preserved from the first half of the 12th century. They were crafted in Almería in Al-Andalus, at a time when it was a prosperous port city under Almoravid control. The tombstones were made of Macael marble, which was quarried locally, and carved with extensive Kufic inscriptions that were sometimes adorned with vegetal or geometric motifs. These demonstrate that the Almoravids not only reused Umayyad marble columns and basins, but also commissioned new works. The inscriptions on them are dedicated to various individuals, both men and women, from a range of different occupations, indicating that such tombstones were relatively affordable. The stones take the form of either rectangular stelae or of long horizontal prisms known as mqabriyyas (similar to the ones found in the much later Saadian Tombs of Marrakesh). They have been found in many locations across West Africa and Western Europe, which is evidence that a wide-reaching industry and trade in marble existed. A number of pieces found in France were likely acquired from later pillaging. Some of the most ornate tombstones found outside Al-Andalus were discovered in Gao-Saney in the African Sahel, testament to the reach of Almoravid influence into the African continent.

Two Almoravid-period marble columns have also been found reused as spolia in later monuments in Fes. One is incorporated into the window of the Dar al-Muwaqqit (timekeeper's house) overlooking the courtyard of the Qarawiyyin Mosque, built in the Marinid period. The other is embedded into the decoration of the exterior southern façade of the Zawiya of Moulay Idris II, a structure which was rebuilt by Ismail Ibn Sharif.

Textiles 
The fact that Ibn Tumart, leader of the Almohad movement, is recorded as having criticized Sultan Ali ibn Yusuf for "sitting on a luxurious silken cloak" at his grand mosque in Marrakesh indicates the important role of textiles under the Almoravids.

Many of the remaining fabrics from the Almoravid period were reused by Christians, with examples in the reliquary of San Isidoro in León, a chasuble from Saint-Sernin in Toulouse, the Chasuble of San Juan de Ortega in the church of Quintanaortuña (near Burgos), the shroud of San Pedro de Osma, and a fragment found at the church of Thuir in the eastern Pyrenees. Some of these pieces are characterized by the appearance of Kufic or "Hispano-Kufic" woven inscriptions, with letters sometimes ending in ornamental vegetal flourishes. The Chasuble of San Juan de Ortega is one such example, made of silk and gold thread and dating to the first half of the 12th century. The Shroud of San Pedro de Osma is notable for its inscription stating "this was made in Baghdad", suggesting that it was imported. However, more recent scholarship has suggested that the textile was instead produced locally in centres such as Almeria, but that they were copied or based on eastern imports. It's even possible that the inscription was knowingly falsified in order to exaggerate its value to potential sellers; Al-Saqati of Málaga, a 12th-century writer and market inspector, wrote that there were regulations designed to prohibit the practice of making such false inscriptions. As a result of the inscription, many of these textiles are known in scholarship as the "Baghdad group", representing a stylistically coherent and artistically rich group of silken textiles seemingly dating to reign of Ali ibn Yusuf or the first half of the 12th century. Aside from the inscription, the shroud of San Pedro de Osma is decorated with images of two lions and harpies inside roundels that are ringed by images of small men holding griffins, repeating across the whole fabric. The chasuble from Saint-Sernin is likewise decorated with figural images, in this case a pair of peacocks repeating in horizontal bands, with vegetal stems separating each pair and small kufic inscriptions running along the bottom.

The decorative theme of having a regular grid of roundels containing images of animals and figures, with more abstract motifs filling the spaces in between, has origins traced as far back as Persian Sasanian textiles. In subsequent periods, starting with the Almohads, these roundels with figurative imagery are progressively replaced with more abstract roundels, while epigraphic decoration becomes more prominent than before.

Calligraphy and manuscript illumination 
In early Islamic manuscripts, Kufic was the main script used for religious texts. Western or Maghrebi Kufic evolved from the standard (or eastern) Kufic style and was marked by the transformation of the low swooping sections of letters from rectangular forms to long semi-circular forms. It is found in 10th century Qurans before the Almoravid period. Almoravid Kufic is the variety of Maghrebi Kufic script that was used as an official display script during the Almoravid period.

Eventually, Maghrebi Kufic gave rise to a distinctive cursive script known as "Maghrebi", the only cursive script of Arabic derived from Kufic, which was fully formed by the early 12th century under the Almoravids. This style was commonly used in Qurans and other religious works from this period onward, but it was rarely ever used in architectural inscriptions. One version of this script during this early period is the Andalusi script, which was associated with Al-Andalus. It was usually finer and denser, and while the loops of letters below the line are semi-circular, the extensions of letters above the line continue to use straight lines that recall its Kufic origins. Another version of the script is rounder and larger, and is more associated with the Maghreb, although it is nonetheless found in Andalusi volumes too.

The oldest known illuminated Quran from the western Islamic world (i.e. the Maghreb and Al-Andalus) dates from 1090, towards the end of the first Taifas period and the beginning of the Almoravid domination in Al-Andalus. It was produced either in the Maghreb or Al-Andalus and is now kept at the Uppsala University Library. Its decoration is still in the earliest phases of artistic development, lacking the sophistication of later volumes, but many of the features that were standard in later manuscripts are present: the script is written in the Maghrebi style in black ink, but the diacritics (vowels and other orthographic signs) are in red or blue, simple gold and black roundels mark the end of verses, and headings are written in gold Kufic inside a decorated frame and background. It also contains a frontispiece, of relatively simple design, consisting of a grid of lozenges variously filled with gold vegetal motifs, gold netting, or gold Kufic inscriptions on red or blue backgrounds.

More sophisticated illumination is already evident in a copy of a sahih dated to 1120 (during the reign of Ali ibn Yusuf), also produced in either the Maghreb or Al-Andalus, with a rich frontispiece centered around a large medallion formed by an interlacing geometric motif, filled with gold backgrounds and vegetal motifs. A similarly sophisticated Quran, dated to 1143 (at the end of Ali ibn Yusuf's reign) and produced in Córdoba, contains a frontispiece with an interlacing geometric motif forming a panel filled with gold and a knotted blue roundel at the middle.

Ceramics 
The Almoravid conquest of al-Andalus caused a temporary rupture in ceramic production, but it returned in the 12th century. There is a collection of about 2,000 Maghrebi-Andalusi ceramic basins or bowls in Pisa, where they were used to decorated churches from the early 11th to fifteenth centuries. There were a number of varieties of ceramics under the Almoravids, including cuerda seca pieces. The most luxurious form was iridescent lustreware, made by applying a metallic glaze to the pieces before a second firing. This technique came from Iraq and flourished in Fatimid Egypt.

Minbars 

The Almoravid minbars — such as the minbar of the Grand Mosque of Marrakesh commissioned by Sultan Ali ibn Yusuf (1137), or the minbar for the University of al-Qarawiyyin (1144) — expressed the Almoravids' Maliki legitimacy, their "inheritance of the Umayyad imperial role", and the extension of that imperial power into the Maghreb. Both minbars are exceptional works of marquetry and woodcarving, decorated with geometric compositions, inlaid materials, and arabesque reliefs.

Architecture 

The Almoravid period, along with the subsequent Almohad period, is considered one of the most formative stages of Moroccan and Moorish architecture, establishing many of the forms and motifs of this style that were refined in subsequent centuries. Manuel Casamar Perez remarks that the Almoravids scaled back the Andalusi trend towards heavier and more elaborate decoration which had developed since the Caliphate of Córdoba and instead prioritized a greater balance between proportions and ornamentation.

The two centers of artistic production in the Islamic west before the rise of the Almoravids were Kairouan and Córdoba, both former capitals in the region which served as sources of inspiration. The Almoravids were responsible for establishing a new imperial capital at Marrakesh, which became a major center of architectural patronage thereafter. The Almoravids adopted the architectural developments of al-Andalus, such as the complex interlacing arches of the Great Mosque in Córdoba and of the Aljaferia palace in Zaragoza, while also introducing new ornamental techniques from the east such as muqarnas ("stalactite" or "honeycomb" carvings).

After taking control of Al-Andalus in the Battle of Sagrajas, the Almoravids sent Muslim, Christian and Jewish artisans from Iberia to North Africa to work on monuments. The Great Mosque in Algiers, the Great Mosque of Tlemcen (1136) and al-Qarawiyyin (expanded in 1135) in Fez are important examples of Almoravid architecture. The Almoravid Qubba is one of the few Almoravid monuments in Marrakesh surviving, and is notable for its highly ornate interior dome with carved stucco decoration, complex arch shapes, and minor muqarnas cupolas in the corners of the structure. The central nave of the expanded Qarawiyyin Mosque notably features the earliest full-fledged example of muqarnas vaulting in the western Islamic world. The complexity of these muqarnas vaults at such an early date – only several decades after the first simple muqarnas vaults appeared in distant Iraq – has been noted by architectural historians as surprising. Another high point of Almoravid architecture is the intricate ribbed dome in front of the mihrab of the Great Mosque of Tlemcen, which likely traces its origins to the 10th-century ribbed domes of the Great Mosque of Córdoba. The structure of the dome is strictly ornamental, consisting of multiple ribs or intersecting arches forming a twelve-pointed star pattern. It is also partly see-through, allowing some outside light to filter through a screen of pierced and carved arabesque decoration that fills the spaces between the ribs.

Aside from more ornamental religious structures, the Almoravids also built many fortifications, although most of these in turn were demolished or modified by the Almohads and later dynasties. The new capital, Marrakesh, initially had no city walls but a fortress known as the Ksar el-Hajjar ("Fortress of Stone") was built by the city's founder, Abu Bakr ibn Umar, in order to house the treasury and serve as an initial residence. Eventually, circa 1126, Ali Ibn Yusuf also constructed a full set of walls, made of rammed earth, around the city in response to the growing threat of the Almohads. These walls, although much restored and partly expanded in later centuries, continue to serve as the walls of the medina of Marrakesh today. The medina's main gates were also first built at this time, although many of them have since been significantly modified. Bab Doukkala, one of the western gates, is believed to have best preserved its original Almoravid layout. It has a classic bent entrance configuration, of which variations are found throughout the medieval period of the Maghreb and Al-Andalus. Elsewhere, the archaeological site of Tasghîmût, southeast of Marrakesh, and Amargu, northeast of Fes, provide evidence about other Almoravid forts. Built out of rubble stone or rammed earth, they illustrate similarities with older Hammadid fortifications, as well as an apparent need to build quickly during times of crisis. The walls of Tlemcen (present-day Algeria) were likewise partly built by the Almoravids, using a mix of rubble stone at the base and rammed earth above.

In domestic architecture, none of the Almoravid palaces or residences have survived, and they are known only through texts and archaeology. During his reign, Ali Ibn Yusuf added a large palace and royal residence on the south side of the Ksar el-Hajjar (on the present site of the Kutubiyya Mosque). This palace was later abandoned and its function was replaced by the Almohad Kasbah, but some of its remains have been excavated and studied in the 20th century. These remains have revealed the earliest known example in Morocco of a riad garden (an interior garden symmetrically divided into four parts). In 1960 other excavations near Chichaoua revealed the remains of a domestic complex or settlement dating from the Almoravid period or even earlier. It consisted of several houses, two hammams, a water supply system, and possibly a mosque. On the site were found many fragments of architectural decoration which are now preserved at the Archeological Museum of Rabat. These fragments are made of deeply-carved stucco featuring Kufic and cursive Arabic inscriptions as well as vegetal motifs such as palmettes and acanthus leaves. The structures also featured painted decoration in red ochre, typically consisting of border motifs composed of two interlacing bands. Similar decoration has also been found in the remains of former houses excavated in 2006 under the 12th-century Almoravid expansion of the Qarawiyyin Mosque in Fes. In addition to the usual border motifs were larger interlacing geometric motifs as well as Kufic inscriptions with vegetal backgrounds, all executed predominantly in red.

Literature 

The Almoravid movement has its intellectual origins in the writings and teachings of Abu Imran al-Fasi, who first inspired Yahya Ibn Ibrahim of the Godala tribe in Kairouan. Ibn Ibrahim then inspired Abdallah ibn Yasin to organize for jihad and start the Almoravid movement.

Moroccan literature flourished in the Almoravid period. The political unification of Morocco and al-Andalus under the Almoravid dynasty rapidly accelerated the cultural interchange between the two continents, beginning when Yusuf ibn Tashfin sent al-Mu'tamid ibn Abbad, former poet king of the Taifa of Seville, into exile in Tangier and ultimately Aghmat.

The historians Ibn Hayyan, Al-Bakri, Ibn Bassam, and al-Fath ibn Khaqan all lived in the Almoravid period. Ibn Bassam authored , Al-Fath ibn Khaqan authored Qala'idu l-'Iqyan, and Al-Bakri authored al-Masālik wa ’l-Mamālik (Book of Roads and Kingdoms).

In the Almoravid period two writers stand out: Qadi Ayyad and Avempace. Ayyad is known for having authored Kitāb al-Shifāʾ bī Taʾrif Ḥuqūq al-Muṣṭafá. Many of the Seven Saints of Marrakesh were men of letters.

The muwashshah was an important form of poetry and music in the Almoravid period.

The Moroccan historian  noted that there were 104 paper mills in Fez under Yusuf ibn Tashfin in the 11th century.

Military organization
Abdallah ibn Yasin imposed very strict disciplinary measures on his forces for every breach of his laws. The Almoravids' first military leader, Yahya ibn Umar al-Lamtuni, gave them a good military organization. Their main force was infantry, armed with javelins in the front ranks and pikes behind, which formed into a phalanx, and was supported by camelmen and horsemen on the flanks. They also had a flag carrier at the front who guided the forces behind him; when the flag was upright, the combatants behind would stand and when it was turned down, they would sit.

Al-Bakri reports that, while in combat, the Almoravids did not pursue those who fled in front of them. Their fighting was intense and they did not retreat when disadvantaged by an advancing opposing force; they preferred death over defeat. These characteristics were possibly unusual at the time.

Legends
After the death of El Cid, Christian chronicles reported a legend of a Turkish woman leading a band of 300 "Amazons", black female archers. This legend was possibly inspired by the ominous veils on the faces of the warriors and their dark skin colored blue by the indigo of their robes.

Dynasty

Rulers
Sanhaja tribal leaders recognizing the spiritual authority of Abdallah ibn Yasin (d. 1058 or 1059):
 Yahya Ibn Ibrahim al-Jaddali (also referred to as al-Jawhar ibn Sakkum)
 Yahya ibn Umar al-Lamtuni (d. 1055 or 1056)
 Abu Bakr ibn Umar (d. 1087)

Subsequent rulers:
 Yusuf ibn Tashfin (1061–1106, initially as Abu Bakr's lieutenant in the north)
 Ibrahim ibn Abu Bakr (ruler of Sijilmasa, 1070–1075)
 Ali ibn Yusuf (1106–1143)
 Tashfin ibn Ali (1143–1145)
 Ibrahim ibn Tashfin (1145, dethroned quickly)
 Ishaq ibn Ali (1145–1147)

Family tree

Timeline

Notes

References

Citations

Bibliography 

 
 
 Brett, M. and E. Fentress (1996), The Berbers. Oxford: Blackwell.
 
 Hrbek, I. and J. Devisse (1988), "The Almoravids", in M. Elfasi, ed., General History of Africa, Africa from the Seventh to the Eleventh Century, UNESCO. 1992 edition, Ch. 13, pp. 336–66.
 
 
 
 
 
 
 
 Levtzion, N. and J. F. P. Hopkins, eds (1981), Corpus of Early Arabic Sources for West African History, Cambridge, UK: Cambridge University Press. 2000 edition.
 
 
 Moraes Farias, P. F. de (1967), "The Almoravids: Some Questions Concerning the Character of the Movement", Bulletin de l’IFAN, series B, 29:3–4, pp. 794–878.
 
 

 
11th century in Al-Andalus
12th century in Al-Andalus
Medieval Algeria
History of Mauritania
History of Western Sahara
11th-century establishments in Africa
1147 disestablishments
12th-century disestablishments in Morocco
States and territories established in 1040
States and territories disestablished in 1147
Historical transcontinental empires
Former empires in Africa